"" (Our Father in Heaven) is a Lutheran hymn in German by Martin Luther. He wrote the paraphrase of the Lord's Prayer in 1538, corresponding to his explanation of the prayer in his  (Small Catechism). He dedicated one stanza to each of the seven petitions and framed it with an opening and a closing stanza, each stanza in six lines. Luther revised the text several times, as extant manuscript show, concerned to clarify and improve it. He chose and possibly adapted an older anonymous melody, which was possibly associated with secular text, after he had first selected a different one. Other hymn versions of the Lord's Prayer from the 16th and 20th-century have adopted the same tune, known as "Vater unser" and "Old 112th".

The hymn was published in Leipzig in 1539 in Valentin Schumann's hymnal , with a title explaining "The Lord's Prayer briefly expounded and turned into metre". It was likely first published as a broadsheet.

The hymn was translated into English in several versions, for example "Our Father, Thou in Heaven Above" by Catherine Winkworth in 1863 and "Our Father, Lord of Heaven and Earth" by Henry J. de Jong in 1982. In the current German hymnal  (EG) it is number 344.

Text 

Below is the German text from the 1539 Gesangbuch of Valentin Schumann with the English translation by George MacDonald.

Hymn tune 
Below is the hymn tune from Valentin Schumann's Gesangbuch of 1539 (Zahn No. 2561).

In English-language publications, the tune has also appeared with various unrelated texts, and its use in English and Scottish Psalters as a setting for Psalm 112 has led to the tune being referred to as "Old 112th" in some hymnals. The original rhythm is also sometimes altered, as for example in a harmonisation by Johann Sebastian Bach:

Use in musical compositions 
Numerous composers used the hymn tune, some also the text. There are choral settings by Orlando di Lasso, Michael Praetorius and Samuel Scheidt. Johann Ulrich Steigleder composed 40 three-part variations on the hymn tune and published them as a Tabulaturbuch in Strasbourg in 1627. Amongst those who set it as a chorale prelude for organ are Michael Praetorius, Jacob Praetorius, Samuel Scheidt and Heinrich Scheidemann. Johann Pachelbel included a chorale prelude in his liturgical collection Erster Theil etlicher Choräle.

Dieterich Buxtehude set the hymn twice as a chorale prelude. The freely composed chorale prelude BuxWV 207 has three separate verses: the first two for manuals alone have one or two quasi-improvisatory voices accompanying a plain cantus firmus; the third verse is a four-part setting for two manuals and pedal with a highly ornamented cantus firmus in the soprano voice. The cantus firmus is also elaborately developed in Buxtehude's ornamental choral prelude BuxWV 219 for two manuals and pedal.

Georg Böhm also set the hymn twice as a chorale prelude (formerly misattributed to Bach as BWV 760 and 761), in addition to a setting as an organ partita.

Johann Sebastian Bach used the hymn tune in several of his chorale preludes for organ. One early setting (BWV 737) can be found in the collection of Neumeister Chorales. There is a four-part setting BWV 636 in his Orgelbüchlein (Little Organ Book). Bach's late Clavier-Übung III (German Organ Mass) contains a pair of settings BWV 682-683: an elaborate one for five voices with the cantus firmus in canon over a trio sonata ritornello; and a shorter four-part setting for single manual. In his choral works, Bach used the melody in his cantata Es reißet euch ein schrecklich Ende, BWV 90 (1723), the chorale cantata Nimm von uns, Herr, du treuer Gott, BWV 101 (1724) and cantata Herr, deine Augen sehen nach dem Glauben, BWV 102 (1726), and stanza 4 in his St John Passion (1724) (BWV 416 is an earlier version of the same harmonisation).

Felix Mendelssohn included the melody in his Sixth Organ Sonata. Max Reger composed a chorale prelude as No. 39 of his 52 Chorale Preludes, Op. 67 in 1902.

See also 

 List of hymns by Martin Luther

References

Bibliography 

16th-century hymns in German
Hymn tunes
Hymns by Martin Luther
1538 works